Epimacha is a genus of beetles in the family Buprestidae, containing the following species:

 Epimacha helferi (Obenberger, 1935)
 Epimacha planata (Kerremans, 1900)
 Epimacha theryi (Kerremans, 1903)

References

Buprestidae genera